Herbert Farmer may refer to:

 Herbert Allen Farmer (1891–1948), American criminal who operated a safe house
 Herbert Henry Farmer (1892–1981), British Presbyterian minister, philosopher of religion, and academic

See also
Herb farm